Andrey Rzhetsky is the Edna K. Papazian Professor of Medicine and Professor of Human Genetics at the University of Chicago, where he is also Co-Chief of the Section of Computational Biomedicine and Biomedical Data Science. Born in Kazakhstan, Rzhetsky was recruited to Pennsylvania State University (Penn State) by Masatoshi Nei in 1991 from the Institute of Cytology and Genetics in Novosibirsk, Russia. Rzhetsky did his postdoc at Penn State under Nei, who also helped him obtain his permanent residency in the United States. He joined the faculty at Columbia University in 1996. He joined the faculty of the University of Chicago in 2007, and was named the Edna K. Papazian Professor there in 2016.

References

External links
Faculty page

Kazakhstani emigrants to the United States
Living people
American geneticists
Columbia University faculty
University of Chicago faculty
Novosibirsk State University alumni
Human geneticists
Computational biologists
Year of birth missing (living people)